German automaker Opel has shown more concept cars than production cars since 1965.

See also

List of automobiles
List of Opel vehicles

References

External links
Old Opel Concept Cars

Opel concept vehicles